BSPR may stand for:
Boise State Public Radio
Boston Society for Psychical Research
British Society for Proteome Research, a member of the UK Biosciences Federation
British Society for the Philosophy of Religion